Statistics of Guam League for the 2007 season.

League standings

References
Guam 2007 (RSSSF)

Guam Soccer League seasons
Guam
Guam
football